Gazabad (also Romanized as Gazābād) is a village in Atrak Rural District, Maneh District, Maneh and Samalqan County, North Khorasan Province, Iran. At the 2006 census, its population was 548, in 136 families.

References 

Populated places in Maneh and Samalqan County